Aristides Aquino Núñez (born April 22, 1994) is a Dominican professional baseball outfielder for the Chunichi Dragons of Nippon Professional Baseball (NPB). He has played for the Cincinnati Reds of Major League Baseball.

Career

Cincinnati Reds
Aquino signed with the Cincinnati Reds as an international free agent from the Dominican Prospect League in January 2011. He made his professional debut that year with the Dominican Summer League Reds and also spent 2012 playing with them. He played for the Arizona League Reds and Billings Mustangs in 2013, Billings in 2014 and Billings and Dayton Dragons in 2015. In 2016, he played for the Daytona Tortugas and was named the Florida State League Player of the Year. The Reds added him to their 40-man roster after the season.

Aquino was called up to the majors for the first time on August 17, 2018, to take the place of Joey Votto, who was placed on the 10-day disabled list. On August 19, 2018, Aquino made his major league debut as a pinch runner for Scooter Gennett. Aquino stayed in the game to play right field, and later struck out in his first major league at bat facing Ray Black. He was non-tendered and became a free agent on November 30, 2018. He re-signed a minor league deal on December 3, 2018.  

He opened the 2019 season with the Louisville Bats. On August 1, the Reds selected Aquino's contract. Aquino hit seven home runs in his first ten major league games, tying the record of Trevor Story. On August 10, 2019, in a game against the Chicago Cubs, Aquino hit three home runs, becoming the first rookie in MLB history to hit a home run in three consecutive innings, and the second rookie after Bobby Estalella to have a three home run game in his first ten career games.

On August 16, 2019, Aquino became the first player in modern MLB history with 10 home runs in his first 16 career games. The next day, he hit his eleventh home run in 17 games. He also holds the record for most home runs in a month for a National League rookie (14), in addition to tying the Reds franchise record for home runs in a month for any player. 

Aquino saw limited playing time in 2020 due to the addition of Nicholas Castellanos, appearing in only 23 games, batting a meager .170/.304/.319 with 2 home runs and 8 RBI.

On April 25, 2021, Aquino was placed on the 60-day injured list as he recovered from hamate bone surgery. He was activated on June 13. 

On April 30, 2022, Aquino was designated for assignment by the Cincinnati Reds and was sent outright to Triple-A. On May 20, Aquino was selected back to the active roster. He was removed from the 40-man roster and returned to Triple-A on May 23, but was selected back to the active roster hours later.

On November 15, Aquino was designated for assignment. On November 18, he was non-tendered and became a free agent.

Chunichi Dragons
On November 27, 2022, Aquino signed with the Chunichi Dragons of Nippon Professional Baseball.

References

External links

1994 births
Living people
Sportspeople from Santo Domingo
Dominican Republic expatriate baseball players in the United States
Dominican Republic expatriate baseball players in Japan
Major League Baseball players from the Dominican Republic
Major League Baseball outfielders
Chunichi Dragons players
Cincinnati Reds players
Dominican Summer League Reds players
Arizona League Reds players
Billings Mustangs players
Dayton Dragons players
Daytona Tortugas players
Pensacola Blue Wahoos players
Louisville Bats players
Leones del Escogido players
Tigres del Licey players